The Bloyd Formation, or Bloyd Shale, is a geologic formation in Arkansas. It preserves fossils dating back to the Carboniferous period.

Stratigraphy
The Bloyd Formation conformably overlies the Hale Formation and unconformably underlies the Atoka Formation. Five formal and one informal members are recognized in the Bloyd Formation (in stratigraphic order):
Kessler Limestone Member
Dye Shale Member
Parthenon Sandstone Member (also known as the "middle Bloyd sandstone")
Woolsey Member
Baldwin coal (an informal unit at the top of the Woolsey Member)
Brentwood Limestone Member

In the eastern parts of the Ozarks in Arkansas, the Bloyd Formation becomes undifferentiated with the underlying Hale Formation and is called the Witts Springs Formation.

Paleontology

Brachiopods

Anthracospirifer
A. newberryi
Antiquatonia
A. coloradoensis
Hustedia
H. brentwoodensis

Linoproductus
L. nodosus
Orthotetes
Rhynchopora
R. magnicosta
Tesuquea
T. formosa

Bryozoans

Anisotrypa
Coscinotrypa
C. fayettevillensis
C. gracilens
Fenestella
F. morrowensis
F. serratula
F. venusta
Fistulipora
Glyptopora
G. crassitoma
Lyropora
Matheropora
M. triseriata

Polypora
P. anastomosa
P. constricta
P. elliptica
P. kesslerensis
P. magna
P. purduei
P. triseriata
P. washingtonensis
Phyllopora
P. cribosa
Prismopora
P. concava

Rhombopora
R. attenuata
R. lepidodendroides
R. snideri
R. tabulata
Septopora
S. implexa
S. reversispina
Sulcoretepora
S. brentwoodensis
S. sinuomarginata
Tabulipora
T. tuberculata

Cephalopods

 Axinolobus
 A. modulus
 A. quinni
 Bisatoceras
 B. micromphalus
 B. secundum
 Boesites
 B. scotti
 Branneroceras
 B. branneri
 Cancelloceras
 Cymoceras
 C. miseri
 Diaboloceras
 D. neumeieri
 Euloxoceras

 Gaitherites
 G. morrowensis
 Gastrioceras
 G. adaense
 G. araium
 G. attenuatum
 G. branneri
 G. fittsi
 Glaphyrites
 G. depressus
 G. morrowensis
 G. oblatus
 Homoceratoides
 H. crancens
 Liroceras
 Metadimorphoceras
 M. subdivisum

 Mooreoceras
 M. normale
 Perigrammoceras
 Phaneroceras
 P. compressum
 P. kesslerense
 Proshumardites
 P. morrowanus
 Pseudoparalegoceras
 P. compressum
 P. kesslerense
 Pseudopronorites
 P. arkansiensis
 P. quinni
 Pseudorthoceras
 P. knoxense

 Pygmaeoceras
 P. pygmaeum
 P. solidum
 Solenochilus
 Stearoceras
 S. smithi
 Stenopronorites
 S. arkansiensis
 Syngastrioceras
 S. globosum
 S. oblatum
 Verneuilites
 V. pygmaeus
 Wiedeyoceras
 W. smithi

Conodonts

 Adetognathus
 A. gigantus
 A. lautus
 Hibbardella
 Idiognathodus
 I. sinuosis
 Idiognathoides
 I. convexus
 Ligonodina
 L. typa

 Metalonchodina
 Neognathodus
 N. kunamai
 Neoprioniodus
 Spathognathodus
 S. minutus
 Streptognathodus
 S. suberectus

Crinoids

 Affinocrinus
 A. grandis
 A. progressus
 Alcimocrinus
 A. girtyi
 Allocatillocrinus
 A. rotundus
 A. rotundus multibrachiatus
 Anchicrinus
 A. planulatus
 A. rugosus
 Anobasicrinus
 A. braggsi
 Arkacrinus
 A. constrictus
 A. dubius
 Atokacrinus
 A. tumulosus
 Calycocrinus
 C. furnishi
 C. symmetricus
 Cibolocrinus
 C. circulus
 C. regularis
 C. spinosus
 C. tumidus

 Cromyocrinus
 C. grandis
 Dicromyocrinus
 D. optimus
 D. subaplatus
 Diphuicrinus
 D. croneisi
 D. pentanodus
 Endelocrinus
 E. matheri
 Globacrocrinus
 G. pirum
 Lassanocrinus
 L. daileyi
 L. minutus
 L. multinodus
 L. nodus
 L. strigosus
 Lecythiocrinus
 L. asymmetricus
 Megaliocrinus
 M. aplatus
 M. exotericus
 Metacromyocrinus
 M. gillumi
 M. papulosus

 Metautharocrinus
 M. cockei
 M. spinifer
 Morrowocrinus
 M. fosteri
 Palmerocrinus
 P. kesslerensis
 Paracromyocrinus
 P. oklahomensis
 Paradelocrinus
 P. aequabilis
 Paragassizocrinus
 P. caliculus
 P. magnus
 Paramphicrinus
 P. magnus
 Perimestocrinus
 P. pumilus
 P. teneris
 Phacelocrinus
 P. brevis
 P. rosei
 Planacrocrinus
 P. conicus
 P. minutus

 Platyacrocrinus
 P. brentwoodensis
 Platycrinites
 Sciadiocrinus
 S. cascus
 S. crassacanthus
 Scytalocrinus
 S. crassibrachiatus
 Stenopecrinus
 S. ornatus
 Stereobrachicrinus
 S. pustulosus
 Strongylocrinus
 S. hansoni
 S. ornatus
 Ulrichicrinus
 U. oklahoma
 U. pentanodus

Flora
Archaeolithophyllum
A. missouiense
Cuneiphycus
C. aliquantulus
Donezella
Eflugelia
Girvanella
G. minuta
Paraepimastopora
Stachedoides 
S. spissa

Foraminifera

Ammodiscus
Ammovertella
Archaediscus
Asteroarchaediscus
A. rugosus
Biseriella
Calcitornella
C. adherens
Climacammina
Diplospahaerina
D. inaequalis
Endothyra
Endothyranella
Eolasiodiscus
E. donbassicus

Eosigmoilina
Eostafella
Hemigordius
H. harltoni
Millerella
M. marblensis
M. pressa
Monotaxinoides
M. transitorius
Neoarchaediscus
Palaeonubecularia
Paramillerella
P. pinguis
Planoendothyra
P. evoluta

Plectogyra
Pseudoglomospira
Tetrataxis
T. maxima
Trepeilopsis
T. minima
Tuberatina
T. plana
Turrispiroides
T. multivolutus

Ostracods
Amphissites
A. confluens
A. nodosus
A. rothi
Bairdiolites
Hollinella
H. bassleri
Kegelites
Kirkbya
K. bendensis
K. jolliffana
Pseudoparaparchites

Sponges
Haplistion
H. sphaericum
Steioderma
S. hadra
Virgaspongia
V. ichnata

Trace Fossils
Conostichus
C. arkansanus

Incertae sedis
Asphaltina
A. cordillerensis
Clacisphaera
C. laevis
Nostocites
Osagia
Proninella
P. strigosa

See also

 List of fossiliferous stratigraphic units in Arkansas
 Paleontology in Arkansas

References

 

Carboniferous geology of Oklahoma
Carboniferous Arkansas
Carboniferous southern paleotropical deposits